Iovino is a surname. Notable people with this surname include:

 Pam Iovino, American politician
 Salvatore Iovino (born 1983), American stock car racing driver
 Sandro Iovino (born 1939), Italian actoractor
 Serenella Iovino, Italian philosopher, and cultural and literary theorist

Italian-language surnames